Mengin is a surname. Notable people with the surname include:
 Charles Mengin (1853–1933), French painter
 Christophe Mengin (born 1968), French cyclist
 Ernst Mengin (1893–1973), German Mesoamericanist
 Félix Mengin, French trader, temporary French consul and writer